Dean Treister (born 19 December 1975) is an Australian former rugby league footballer who played in the 1990s, and 2000s. A member of the Cronulla-Sutherland Sharks team, Treister played many games for the club from 1993 to 2003, including the 1997 Super League Grand Final. Throughout his time at the Cronulla-Sutherland Sharks he was a favourite amongst the fans. Treister was known for his creative ability in attack and his ability to control the game.

Playing career
Treister was a local Cronulla junior and made his first-grade debut in 1995 after winning the President's Cup premiership with Cronulla.

In 1996, Cronulla finished 5th on the table and reached the preliminary final before being defeated by Manly 24–0 with Treister starting at hooker.  In 1997, Cronulla signed with the rival super league competition at the height of the super league war.  Cronulla reached the 1997 super league grand final but were defeated by Brisbane 26–8.

In 1999, Cronulla enjoyed their best season on the field since being admitted into the competition by winning the minor premiership.  Treister also enjoyed one of his best seasons for the club making the preliminary final against St George.  Treister played in the match that saw Cronulla lead at half time but suffered a second half collapse to lose 24–8.  

In 2002, Cronulla finished 5th on the table and reached their 4th preliminary final in 8 years as they played against the New Zealand Warriors.  Treister played at hooker in the match as Cronulla suffered another heartbreaking exit losing 16–10.

Treister joined Hull F.C. part way through the 2003 NRL Season after being dropped to reserve grade alongside fellow club stalwart Nick Graham by new coach Chris Anderson. It was reported that his demotion to reserve grade occurred as a result of club politics, with a rumoured falling out between himself and the coach the alleged cause.

Post playing
Treister has been living in the United States since he retired and is married with 3 children.

References

Australian rugby league players
Cronulla-Sutherland Sharks players
Living people
1975 births
Rugby league hookers
Rugby league players from Sydney